Iya is a stratovolcano located in the south-central part of the island of Flores, Indonesia, south of the city of Ende.

See also 
 List of volcanoes in Indonesia

References 

Iya
Iya
Iya
Iya
Holocene stratovolcanoes